Gruta do Centenário (English: Centenary grotto) (MG-1081), is a cave located in the municipality of Mariana, in the state of Minas Gerais, Brazil. It is the largest and deepest quartzite cave in the world, and second in the country in terms of unevenness. Other caves which are part of the same system have now been partially explored.

History 
The beginnings of the Brazilian speleology in the eighteenth and nineteenth century mingle with the history of Caraça. From 1818 reports of two European naturalists, Johann Baptist von Spix and Carl Friedrich Philipp von Martius, cited the existence of several caves in the Serra do Caraça.

Six more caves have been explored: Centenário II, with 20 meters of horizontal projection, Centenário III, formed by two parallel galleries connected by a narrow duct, Centum, Bloco Suspenso, which presents small depths of up to 20 meters, Fumaça and Bocaina with 960 meters of horizontal projection (1,200 linear meters) and 304 meters of unevenness. The altitude of these cave mouths range from 2,051 meters at the top slot, 1,958 meters at the usual entrance to the cave to 1,881 meters at the Inficionado abyss. So far three streams have been identified, the Inficionado stream, Chantilly and Areião. All ducts are narrow, ranging between 30 cm and 10 meters for passages that usually lead to the galleries. Their height goes up to tens of meters, although in just a few the ceiling can be seen.

See also 
 List of caves in Brazil
 Buraco das Araras (Goiás)
 Lapa Terra Ronca

References

External links 
 Base de Dados do Ministerio do Meio Hambiente Governo Federal - ICMBIO Official Website

Caves of Minas Gerais
Quartzite caves
Wild caves
Sinkholes of South America